Henrieta Horvátová (born 18 September 1999 in Banská Bystrica) is a Slovak biathlete. She competed at the  2022 Winter Olympics, in Women's individual Biathlon, and Women's sprint.

She competed at the 2021–22 Biathlon World Cup.

References

External links
 

1999 births
Living people
Slovak female biathletes
Olympic biathletes of Slovakia
Biathletes at the 2022 Winter Olympics
Biathletes at the 2016 Winter Youth Olympics
Sportspeople from Banská Bystrica